Aechmea contracta is a species of flowering plant in the Bromeliaceae family. It is native to Venezuela, Colombia, Peru, Guyana and northern Brazil.

References

contracta
Flora of South America
Plants described in 1830
Taxa named by Carl Friedrich Philipp von Martius
Taxa named by Julius Hermann Schultes
Taxa named by John Gilbert Baker